Croft & Boerner was an architectural and engineering firm based in Minneapolis, Minnesota, United States.  It was a partnership of Francis Boerner (1889–1936) and Ernest Croft (1889–1959).  Several of their works are listed on the U.S. National Register of Historic Places for their architecture.

Both Boerner and Croft studied at the University of Minnesota, completing degrees in engineering.  One or both then spent three years in New York City working for Turner Construction Company, a firm then known for its use of reinforced concrete.

Works
Works include:
Northwestern Terminal complex of buildings (c.1919), Minneapolis, Minnesota
Harper and McIntire Company Warehouse (1921), Cedar Rapids, Iowa, NRHP-listed
St. Louis County District Courthouse (1921 addition), 300 S. Fifth Ave., Virginia, Minnesota, NRHP-listed
Ottumwa High School (1923), Ottumwa, Iowa
Mille Lacs County Courthouse (1923), 635 2nd St. SE, Milaca, Minnesota, NRHP-listed
Ottumwa Young Women's Christian Association (1924), 133 W. Second St., Ottumwa, Iowa, NRHP-listed
Franklin Junior High School (1932), 1001 Kingwood St., Brainerd, Minnesota, NRHP-listed

References

Architects from Minnesota
Architecture firms of the United States